Antonios Giannoulas (born 22 October 1976) is a Greek boxer. He competed in the men's middleweight event at the 2000 Summer Olympics.

References

External links
 

1976 births
Living people
Greek male boxers
Olympic boxers of Greece
Boxers at the 2000 Summer Olympics
Sportspeople from Kozani
Mediterranean Games bronze medalists for Greece
Mediterranean Games medalists in boxing
Competitors at the 1997 Mediterranean Games
Middleweight boxers
20th-century Greek people